General elections were held in Belgium on 13 December 1987 to elect members of the Chamber of Representatives and Senate. Elections to the nine provincial councils were also held.

The snap elections were called after the government led by Wilfried Martens (CVP) fell due to the Voeren issue.

Following the election, the King appointed Jean-Luc Dehaene (CVP) as informateur; Dehaene famously replied "Sire, give me one hundred days." 106 days later a new government was formed, again led by CVP leader Wilfried Martens.

Results

Chamber of Representatives

Senate

References

Belgium
General
Belgium